Three referendums were held in Liechtenstein during 2002. The first two were held on 10 March on amending the constitution on sustainable transport and raising money for the "Little Big One" musical festival, both of which were rejected by voters. The third was held on 29 September on the law on land-use planning and was rejected by 74.3% of voters.

Results

Amendment to the constitution regarding sustainable transport

Raising funds for the Little Big One music festival

Land use planning law

References

2002 referendums
2002 in Liechtenstein
Referendums in Liechtenstein